Wayne station is a commuter rail station located in the western suburbs of Philadelphia at North Wayne Avenue & West Avenue in Wayne, Delaware County, Pennsylvania.  It is served by most Paoli/Thorndale Line trains. It is in Radnor Township.

The Wayne station was built by the Pennsylvania Railroad from 1882 to 1884, on a design by Washington Bleddyn Powell. The original builder was William H. Bilyeu. It consists of two Victorian buildings flanking the rail lines and connected by a tunnel. The station building was restored from 1998 to 2010 with significant local community support and funding. The year after this restoration project began, the station was listed on the National Register of Historic Places. The restoration included repair or replacement of the chimney, masonry, windows, doors, and the retaining wall.

SEPTA began a $22.7 million second phase of improvements that replaced the roof, repaired masonry and structural members, and made other upgrades to the station building. The outbound shelter, dating from about 1890, was rebuilt, mostly with new materials. Also installed were ADA-mandated improvements including new high-level platforms, stairs and ramps to the platforms, building modifications, lighting, handrails, and signage. The new platforms, on both the inbound and outbound sides east of the station building, meant that trains no longer stop in front of the station itself, except in special cases.

Until summer 2010, the building housed the Station Cafe & Juice Bar, which served coffee, tea, and other beverages in the mornings and occasionally featured live jazz at night. The cafe left the station shortly before renovations were completed, and re-opened under new ownership shortly after construction was completed. It is now Fabio & Danny's Station Café.

The ticket office at this station is open weekday mornings excluding holidays. There are 225 parking spaces at the station (including metered daily parking in nearby lots).

This station is 14.5 track miles from Philadelphia's Suburban Station. In 2017, the average total weekday boardings at this station was 526, and the average total weekday alightings was 571.

Wayne station is served by the connector shuttle bus operated by the King of Prussia District, which connects Paoli/Thorndale Line trains at the station to the business parks in King of Prussia during peak weekday hours.

Station layout
Wayne has two partially high-level side platforms with pathways connecting the platforms to the inner tracks.

Photo gallery

References

External links

SEPTA - Wayne Station
Page with a historical photo of Wayne Station
 Wayne Avenue entrance from Google Maps Street View

SEPTA Regional Rail stations
Former Pennsylvania Railroad stations
Philadelphia to Harrisburg Main Line
Radnor Township, Delaware County, Pennsylvania
Railway stations on the National Register of Historic Places in Pennsylvania
Railway stations in Delaware County, Pennsylvania
Railway stations in the United States opened in 1882
National Register of Historic Places in Delaware County, Pennsylvania